Byaruhanga is a surname. Notable people with the surname include:

Kimberly Junior Byaruhanga (born 1980s), Southern African mining magnate, entrepreneur and investor.
Beatrice Ayuru Byaruhanga (born 1970s), Ugandan entrepreneur and school founder
Peter Byaruhanga (born 1979), Ugandan footballer
William Byaruhanga, Ugandan lawyer and businessman
Erikana Kanyamwengye Byaruhanga (born 1941) entomologist and former director of International Red Locust Control Organisation for Central and Southern Africa and Namulonge Research Station

See also
Kasirye Byaruhanga, Ugandan law firm